Minuscule 2460 (in the Gregory-Aland numbering), is a Greek minuscule manuscript of the New Testament, on 205 parchment leaves (24.7 cm by 17.5 cm). It is dated paleographically to the 12th century.

Description 
The codex contains the text of the four Gospels with some lacunae. The text is written in one column per page, in 26 lines per page.

The Greek text of the codex is a representative of the Byzantine text-type. Aland did not place it in any Category. According to the Claremont Profile Method it belongs to the textual family Family Kr in Luke 1 and Luke 20 as a perfect member. In Luke 10 no profile was made.

195 folios of the codex now are housed at the Ioannina, Zosimea School, 2. Ten leaves were catalogued as codex 2417 are located at the Columbia University, Plimpton Ms. 12, and at the Bible Museum Münster (Ms. 19).

See also 
 List of New Testament minuscules
 Textual criticism
 Bible Museum Münster

References

External links 

 Manuscripts of the Bible Museum 
 Images of manuscript 2460 at the CSNTM

Greek New Testament minuscules
12th-century biblical manuscripts